Nisha Nagpal is an Indian television actress.

She shot to fame with her Indian television debut role of Tanveer Beg in Qubool Hai opposite Karan Singh Grover but later she was replaced by Amrapali Gupta due to her health issues. In 2014, she bagged her first lead role of Chandni in the show Masakali.

Apart from this Nagpal was also seen in shows like Yeh Hai Aashiqui, Punar Vivah - Ek Nayi Umeed, Lajwanti, Nisha Aur Uske Cousins, Begusarai and Adhuri Kahaani Hamari.

In 2017 she played the role of Rashi in 4 Lions Films' web series Tanhaiyan.

Filmography

Television

References

External links

Indian women television presenters
Indian television presenters
Living people
Indian television actresses
Indian soap opera actresses
Year of birth missing (living people)